The University of Baltimore School of Law, or the UB School of Law, is one of the four colleges that make up the University of Baltimore, which is part of the University System of Maryland. The UBalt School of Law is one of only two law schools in the state of Maryland. The University of Baltimore School of Law is housed in the John and Frances Angelos Law Center, at the northeast corner of West Mount Royal Avenue and North Charles Street on the University of Baltimore campus in the city's Mt. Vernon cultural district. The 12-story building, designed by German architect Stefan Behnisch, opened in April 2013 and was rated LEED-Platinum by the U.S. Green Building Council.

In addition to writing or editing for the more than half-dozen publications put out by the school, faculty members are frequently featured in national media outlets and invited to speak at national events, thanks partially to the university's location in the Baltimore-Washington metropolitan area.

History

The School of Law was founded in 1925 as part of the then-private, nonprofit University of Baltimore, with the first class of 38 students receiving diplomas in 1928. Created initially to serve the working population of the Baltimore area with a part-time evening program, the school added a full-time day division in 1969. In September 1970, the University of Baltimore School of Law merged with Eastern College and its Mount Vernon School of Law, which was founded in 1935. On Jan. 1, 1975, the school became a public institution when the University of Baltimore joined the State of Maryland's system for public higher education.

An alumni body of approximately 13,000 includes many prominent figures, including Peter Angelos, owner of the Baltimore Orioles; Maryland's former first lady, the Hon. Catherine Curran O'Malley; sports agent Tom Condon; and U.S. Rep. C.A. "Dutch" Ruppersberger III. More than one-third of Maryland's sitting judges are UBalt School of Law graduates, and the number of University of Baltimore law alumni who serve as Maryland elected officials is second only to that of the University of Maryland, College Park. The John and Frances Angelos Law Center offers 192,000 square feet of space and is among the most environmentally sustainable academic buildings in the nation. This 12-story facility, located on the northeast corner of the intersection of North Charles Street and West Mount Royal Avenue, houses all of the school's clinics, centers and classrooms and affords students countless options for indoor and outdoor study.

Post-graduation employment and academics

Employment outcomes

Of Class of 2017 graduates, 67.3% found employment in positions for which bar admission was required. An additional 13.8% of the Class of 2017 found employment in positions for which a J.D. was required or preferred by the employer. (Of 222 graduates, 96.9% reported their employment status.) 32.7% of graduates secured judicial clerkships.

Costs
The School of Law's total cost for full-time attendance (tuition and fees) is $31,954 for in-state residents and $46,622 for out-of-state residents for the 2018–2019 academic year. Students in Washington, D.C., and certain areas of Pennsylvania, Delaware, and northern Virginia are eligible to receive Maryland in-state tuition.

Degrees and concentrations

The University of Baltimore School of Law produces many of the leading lights of Maryland's legal community—practitioners, judges, public defenders, prosecutors, scholars and community and civic advocates. More than one-third of judges on the Maryland state bench are UBalt alumni. The UBalt School of  Law offers the juris doctor (J.D.) degree and master's degrees (LL.M.) in tax and U.S. law. The school offers several concentrations for J.D. students, including:
Business Law
Criminal Practice
Estate Planning
Family Law
Intellectual Property
International & Comparative Law
Litigation & Advocacy
Public and Governmental Service
Real Estate Practice
Tax Law

In conjunction with the law school's and University's other programs and schools, the law school offers joint degree combinations of JD/MBA, JD/MPA, JD/MS in criminal justice, JD/MS in negotiations and conflict management, JD/Ph.D. in policy science and JD/LL.M. in taxation.

The Law Center

Former UBalt President Robert L. Bogomolny called for a path-breaking building that would provide a strong foundation for activities central to the School of Law's mission: community involvement, public interest, diversity. "As an educational institution, we envision a building whose design teaches critical lessons about how to create and sustain healthy urban environments," Bogomolny said before construction began in 2010. "As an institution committed to excellence, we envision a signature building whose materials reflect the quality of our aspirations." In support of these requirements, the Abell Foundation funded a $150,000 design competition for the new facility, a move that brought national and international interest to the project. On Nov. 17, 2008, UBalt announced that Behnisch Architekten of Stuttgart, Germany, in partnership with Baltimore's Ayers/Saint/Gross Inc., won the international competition to design the new John and Frances Angelos Law Center at UBalt. Of the winning design, Bogomolny said: "Stefan Behnisch has articulated an initial concept for our new law center that is truly forward-thinking. Stefan's ideas about sustainable design and his creativity in responding to the evolving needs of higher education place him in the forefront of 21st-century architecture."

The building, rated LEED Platinum by the U.S. Green Building Council, features innovative air-handling systems and the active capture of light and water that would otherwise go to waste.

Centers and clinics

UBalt is home to six law centers: Sayra and Neil Meyerhoff Center for Families, Children and the Courts; Center for International and Comparative Law; Center on Applied Feminism; Center for Sport and the Law; Center for Medicine and the Law, and Center for the Law of Intellectual Property and Technology. The School of Law has 13 clinics: Saul Ewing Civil Advocacy Clinic, Community Development Clinic, Criminal Practice Clinic, Juvenile Justice Project, Human Trafficking Prevention Project, Mental Health Law Clinic, Bronfein Family Law Clinic, Immigrant Rights Clinic, Innocence Project Clinic, Pretrial Justice Clinic, Low-Income Taxpayer Clinic, The Bob Parsons Veterans Advocacy Clinic, and the Mediation Clinic for Families. All of the University of Baltimore School of Law clinics and centers are housed in the John and Frances Angelos Law Center.

The University of Baltimore School of Law annually provides nearly 200 students the opportunity to participate in a broad range of clinical programs and externships. These programs provide both day and evening students a broad range of experiential learning opportunities as licensed student-attorneys (clinics) and closely supervised law clerks (externships).

While students in the clinical program at the University of Baltimore School of Law receive unmatched, real-life practical experience, they also generate significant results that benefit the Baltimore region and Maryland as a whole. In addition, the school's proximity to Washington, D.C., allows students to participate in externships in a wide range of governmental, public-interest and private-sector placements. Clinics represent, on average, 200 low-income clients every year, including adults, children, neighborhood associations and other nonprofit organizations.

Under the supervision of faculty, most clinics allow students to provide the full range of representation to clients. Clinic work includes interviewing, counseling, planning case strategy and appearing in court or before administrative agencies. Certain clinics, such as the Community Development Clinic, provide experience in transactional work.

Finally, most clinics also allow students to engage in more systemic work, including drafting and testifying in support of legislation and participating in state and national task forces on issues such as child neglect, domestic violence, protection for consumers and the promotion of affordable housing.

The clinic facility is run as a law office with a teaching and a public-service mission.

Publications

University of Baltimore Law Review
University of Baltimore Law Forum

Notable alumni

Notable UBalt Law graduates include:

Vice presidents
Spiro Agnew - Former Governor of Maryland, and 39th Vice President of the United States under Richard Nixon.

Judges
Theresa Adams, Associate Judge for the Frederick County Circuit Court
Shirley Brannock Jones - Judge of the United States District Court for the District of Maryland
Laurie McKinnon - Associate Justice of the Montana Supreme Court

Attorneys general
J. Joseph Curran, Jr. (D) - Former Attorney General of Maryland, former Lt. Governor of Maryland

Governors and lieutenant governors
Spiro Agnew (R) - former Governor, & Vice President of the United States
William Donald Schaefer (D) - former Mayor of Baltimore, Governor, & Comptroller of Maryland
Samuel Walter Bogley, III (D) - former Lt. Governor of Maryland
Melvin Steinberg (D) - former Lt. Governor of Maryland, former President of the Maryland Senate

First ladies
Katie O'Malley - Former First Lady of Maryland, wife of Governor Martin O'Malley, and Judge of the District Court of Maryland for Baltimore City
Kendel Sibiski Ehrlich - Former First Lady of Maryland, wife of former Governor Robert L. Ehrlich, Jr.

U.S. congressmen
Bill Emerson (R) - U.S. Congressman, Missouri
Dutch Ruppersberger (D) - U.S. Congressman, Maryland
Frank Kratovil (D) - former U.S. Congressman, Maryland

State delegates and senators
Curt Anderson (D) - Maryland State Delegate, District 43
Ben Barnes (D) - Maryland State Delegate, District 21
Charles Boutin (R) - former member of Maryland House of Delegates
Jill P. Carter (D) - Maryland State Delegate, District 41
Allen C. K. Clark (R) - former member of Maryland House of Delegates, Anne Arundel County
Michael G. Comeau (D) - former member of Maryland House of Delegates
George W. Della Jr. (D) - Maryland State Senate, District 46
Thomas E. Dewberry (born 1951) – judge and member of the Maryland House of Delegates
Donald C. Fry (D) - former Maryland State Senator and Delegate
Keith E. Haynes, (D) - Maryland State Delegate, District 44, Baltimore City
Joseph F. Vallario Jr. (D) - Maryland State Delegate District 27A, Prince George's County

State's attorneys
Davis R. Ruark - former State's Attorney for Wicomico County, Maryland.

Other alumni

Peter Angelos - Majority owner of the Baltimore Orioles
John Angelos - Executive Vice President of the Baltimore Orioles
Pat Moriarty - Senior Vice President of Football Administration for the Baltimore Ravens
Tom Condon - Sports agent, named the most powerful agent in football by Sporting News, represents over 120 players.
Jeffrey Kluger - Author, Journalist
John Clark Mayden - photographer
Steven Milloy - Author, Commentator
Philip H. Goodman - former Mayor of Baltimore
Bishop Robinson - former Police Commissioner of Baltimore
Kevin B. Kamenetz - County Executive of Baltimore County, Maryland.

References in media and culture 
Cedric Daniels - Former Police Commissioner of the Baltimore Police on the fictional television series The Wire.

References

External links

Law
Universities and colleges in Baltimore
Law schools in Maryland
Educational institutions established in 1925
1925 establishments in Maryland